The 189th Massachusetts General Court, consisting of the Massachusetts Senate and the Massachusetts House of Representatives, met in 2015 and 2016 during the governorship of Charlie Baker. Stan Rosenberg served as president of the Senate and Robert DeLeo served as speaker of the House.

Senators

Representatives

See also
 114th United States Congress
 List of Massachusetts General Courts

Images

References

External links

 
  (2015, 2016)
  (includes some video)

Political history of Massachusetts
Massachusetts legislative sessions
massachusetts
2015 in Massachusetts
massachusetts
2016 in Massachusetts